Sir Robert Brown Black  (3 June 1906 – 19 October 1999) was a British colonial administrator who served as Governor of Singapore from 1955 to 1957, and Governor of Hong Kong from 1958 to 1964.

Born in Edinburgh and educated at George Watson's College and the University of Edinburgh, he would spend three decades overseas and return to Britain in the 1960s.

Colonial administration career
Sir Robert Brown Black served in the administration of Britain's colonies for more than 30 years. Entering the colonial service, Black was assigned to Trinidad, but the remainder of his postings were in Asia.

During his posting in North Borneo Black was commissioned into the Intelligence Corps and involved in guerilla resistance against the Japanese. He was captured in 1942 and spent the remainder of World War II in a Japanese prisoner-of-war camp.

After the war ended, he returned to the colonial service and served in North Borneo and Hong Kong before moving on to Singapore as Governor (1955–57). Subsequently, he became Governor of Hong Kong from 1958 to 1964.

Governor of Hong Kong
During his governorship, Hong Kong became increasingly prosperous. At the same time, many tens of thousands of refugees were illegally crossing the border from China every year, driven in part by widespread famine in China during the years 1958–1961. Some were stopped and sent back, but almost all of the hundreds of thousands who reached Kowloon were allowed to stay. This influx placed an enormous burden on the colonial authorities, but the needs of the refugees were met by a programme of public housing construction and public health measures.

Robert Black had been dealing with the patriotic Hong Kong Chinese in a heavy-handed way. On 18 April 1958, a raid was conducted on the library of the Pui Kiu Middle School (PKMS). The officer-in-charge of the Hong Kong Island Section of the Inspectorate of Education visited the school with five assistants. Nineteen books were confiscated and four were used as evidence of the 'mismanagement of the school' in a warning letter addressed to the school supervisor on 13 May. On the basis of these and other accusations, such as hiring of unregistered teachers and discussion of political issues in school meetings, To Pak-fui (杜伯奎), the principal of PKMS, was deported on 6 August, to Lo Wu.

Hong Kong experienced a prolonged drought of unanticipated severity during the last two years of his tenure, which led to a serious water shortage. Water rationing was imposed in May 1962 and continued through August 1964. From June 1963 until late May 1964 (when the arrival of Typhoon Viola ended the drought) the water supply was restricted to a single four-hour period every four days.

Black helped establish the Chinese University of Hong Kong by uniting several smaller institutions. He served as Chancellor of both the Chinese University of Hong Kong and the University of Hong Kong during his tenure as Governor of Hong Kong.

He was knighted (KCMG) in 1955 and promoted to GCMG in 1962.

Post-governorship
Black returned to Britain in 1964. He was active with the Commonwealth War Graves Commission and the Royal Commonwealth Society, and served as chairman of the Clerical Medical and General Life Assurance Society in the 1970s. He died on 19 October 1999, having been predeceased some years earlier (in 1986) by his wife Anne. He was survived by their two daughters, Barbara and Kathryn.

Tributes
Robert Black College, a graduate college of the University of Hong Kong
Robert Black Health Centre in San Po Kong, Hong Kong
Sir Robert Black College of Education, now merged into the Hong Kong Institute of Education
 (for his wife) The Anne Black YWCA, Kowloon
 (for his wife) Anne Black Health Centre, North Point

Notes

Governors of Hong Kong
Intelligence Corps officers
British Army personnel of World War II
1906 births
1999 deaths
Administrators in British Singapore
Chief Secretaries of Hong Kong
Knights Grand Cross of the Order of St Michael and St George
Officers of the Order of the British Empire
People educated at George Watson's College
World War II prisoners of war held by Japan
Alumni of the University of Edinburgh
20th-century Hong Kong people
20th-century British politicians
Governors of the Straits Settlements